Echinoscelis hemithia is a species of moth in the family Cosmopterigidae. It is found in Tonga.

References

External links
Natural History Museum Lepidoptera genus database

Cosmopteriginae